Enrico Pezzi may refer to:

Enrico Pezzi (general) (1897–1942), Italian Air Force general
Enrico Pezzi (footballer) (born 1989), Italian footballer